Kill Haole Day is the term for alleged bullying incidents that occurred in some public Hawaii schools, when non-white students would supposedly harass and attack white students. Kill Haole Day was discussed by the Hawaiian legislature when debating hate crimes legislature in 1999, despite the lack of documented incidents.

In his 2009 book, lawyer and former Hawaii governor Ben Cayetano wrote that "Kill Haole Day" began as a news story headline about an incident between haole and local (not just Hawaiian) students. After that, "whenever there was a fight or an incident between haole and non-haole students, the news media", and newspaper editorial boards, "repeatedly reprised 'Kill Haole Day' in their news stories".

In 1999, School Superintendent Paul LeMahieu said he was aware of "Kill Haole Day" but not of any significant incidents. Also, in 1999, it was an issue during debate on hate crimes legislation.
 
On December 31, 2008, the U.S. Department of Education released a report that concluded there was "substantial evidence that students experienced racially and sexually derogatory violence and name-calling on nearly a daily basis on school buses, at school bus stops, in school hallways and other areas of the school".

The report also concluded that school officials responded inadequately or not at all when students complained of racial harassment. Students who did complain were retaliated against by their antagonists.

References

Hate crime
History of racism in Hawaii
Xenophobia